Leptospermum juniperinum, commonly known as the prickly tea tree, is a species of broom-like shrub that is endemic to eastern Australia. It has narrow, sharply pointed leaves, white flowers usually arranged singly on short side shoots and small fruit that remain on the plant when mature.

Description

Taxonomy
Leptospermum juniperinum was first formally described in 1797 by James Edward Smith in Transactions of the Linnean Society of London. The specific epithet is a reference to a perceived similarity to Junipers.

Distribution and habitat
Prickly tea-tree grows in near-coastal swamps, heath and sedgeland and on sandstone cliffs between Fraser Island in Queensland and Ulladulla in New South Wales.

References

juniperinum
Flora of New South Wales
Flora of South Australia
Myrtales of Australia
Plants described in 1797